Francesco Oliva (born 14 January 1951 in Papasidero) is an Italian Roman Catholic bishop.

Ordained to the priesthood in 1976, Oliva was named bishop of the Roman Catholic Diocese of Locri-Gerace, Italy in May 2014.

External links 
Bishop Oliva on Catholic-Hierarchy

1951 births
Bishops in Calabria
Living people